Art of Chaos is an alternative rock band from Los Angeles, California. Art of Chaos has toured extensively throughout California, headlining shows up and down the coast. The band took part in the southwest leg of Linkin Park's Projekt Revolution tour after winning MTV2's "L.A. Battle Projekt" competition. The band was also voted “Modern Rock Band of Year” and “Performer of the Year” at the 2007 Los Angeles Music Awards.

Touring 
Most of the band's touring has been around the Los Angeles and the American Southwest area, opening for or providing direct support for the following bands:
Linkin Park
My Chemical Romance
Taking Back Sunday
H.I.M.
Julien-K
Placebo
Saosin
Mindless Self Indulgence
Cute Is What We Aim For
Bullets and Octane
Helmet
Madina Lake
The Bled
Full Scale
Yesterdays Rising
Sick Puppies

Notable shows 
Projekt Revolution tour
Hyundai Pavilion (San Bernardino, California)
Shoreline Amphitheater (Mountain View, California)
Coors Amphitheater (Chula Vista, California)
Cricket Amphitheater (Phoenix, Arizona)
Verizon Amphitheater (Selma, Texas)
Smirnoff Music Center (Dallas)
Woodlands Pavilion (Houston). 

Los Angeles area shows
Angel Stadium (Anaheim, CA)
House of Blues (Hollywood, CA)
The Troubadour (Hollywood, CA)
The Key Club (Hollywood, CA)
The Roxy Theatre (Hollywood, CA)
The Viper Room (Hollywood, CA)
Chain Reaction (Anaheim, CA)
Henry Fonda Theatre (Los Angeles, CA)

In the media
Music, interviews, and live performances featured on MTV2 ON DEMAND
Multichannel News, MTV2, Time Warner Experience Art of Chaos - Rock band Wins ‘LA Battle Projekt’ Contest
Roadrunner Records, Blabbermouth.net news article "Linkin Park Selects Battle of the Bands Winner for 'Revolution' - July 27, 2007
LA Music Awards Nominee for 2005 Rock Album of the Year
USC Daily Trojan Newspaper - Article/Interview 3/7/05 – 750 Words
All Access Rock Magazine, Puerto Rico, Lucid album reviewed by Emmanuel
Sick Filthy Rock Magazine, Puerto Rico, Lucid album reviewed by Emmanuel
The Beach Reporter, 9/15/05 “Local bands Battle it out”
Rampage Newspaper, Marshfield, MA Issue VI February/March ‘06 “Music Influencing Teens, In the Spotlight Art of Chaos” by Christina Holt
Daily Trojan, Vol. CXLVI, No.36, March 7, 2005 “Upstart coalition of Trojan talent” by Courtney Lear
Music Connection, Los Angeles, CA Vol. XXX, No. 19 - Demo Critique Issue 19, 2006
Music Connection, Los Angeles, CA – “CHAOS ON DEMAND” by Michael Mollura .
Concert Review: Projekt Revolution – Dallas - MonstesAndCritics.com By Ben Rhudy Aug 9, 2007
IMG Music Promotions Inc, Music Review
Interlude Magazine, Music Review by Caryl Rogers 2006

Awards 
Winner of MTV2 / Time-Warner Cable’s “L.A. Battle Projekt”
“Modern Rock Artist of the Year” and “Performer of the Year” at 2007 Los Angeles Music Awards

Band members 
Brian Torres - Vocals, Guitar, Bass, Drums (2005–present)
Matt Ardisson - Guitar (2005–present)
Jeff Sutton - Bass (2006–2009)
Miles Knowles - Lead guitar (2007–2009)
Brian Sumwalt - Drums (2008–2009)
Tim Galvin - Drums (2008)
Dave Feldman - Drums (2006–2008)

Discography

References 
1. Official site
2. https://web.archive.org/web/20090207065936/http://blogs.myspace.com/index.cfm?fuseaction=blog.view

Alternative rock groups from California